Berkhimer Bridge is a high truss bridge built in 1899 located near Humboldt, Iowa.

Status
Humboldt County Engineer Paul Jacobson speculated that Berkhimer Bridge may be closed due to an increase in traffic on the route. This is because the bridge is being used as an unofficial detour while work is being done on Highway 3 west of Humboldt. The bridge was closed on June 1 due to the stated concerns.

It was closed in 2001 and rehabilitated in 2005.

References

Transportation buildings and structures in Humboldt County, Iowa
Road bridges on the National Register of Historic Places in Iowa
Humboldt, Iowa
National Register of Historic Places in Humboldt County, Iowa
Pennsylvania truss bridges in the United States